WCTG is an adult hits formatted broadcast radio station licensed to West Pocomoke, Maryland, and serving the Salisbury area. WCTG is owned and operated by GSB Broadcasting.

History
WCTG signed on in 2004. On March 7, 2016, Sebago Broadcasting Company, under the licensee of GSB Broadcasting, LLC, closed on the sale of WICO-FM. On the same date, WICO-FM began simulcasting WCTG and the station's adult hits format.

On October 26, 2018, WCTG began transmitting from its new facilities licensed to West Pocomoke, Maryland, and serving the Salisbury area; the station concurrently began simulcasting on WVES in Chincoteague, Virginia, WCTG's previous location. WCTG's previous Salisbury-area simulcast, WICO-FM, had been sold a year earlier to The Bridge of Hope.

References

External links
96-5 CTG Online

2004 establishments in Virginia
Adult hits radio stations in the United States
Radio stations established in 2004
CTG